Woody Woodpecker: Escape from Buzz Buzzard Park is the name of two video games, based on the animated series The New Woody Woodpecker Show (and in turn the animated short film series of same name created by Walter Lantz), one released for the PlayStation 2 and Windows, and the other for the Game Boy Color.

Synopsis 
This game occurs in the universe cartoon. And for much of this adventure, main character is Woody Woodpecker. During the absence of Woody's nephew Knothead and niece Splinter were abducted by the Machiavellian Buzz Buzzard, which requires an exorbitant ransom for a release. Unwilling to pay, Woody goes in search of the missing by venturing into the huge and dangerous amusement park built by Buzz Buzzard.

Gameplay
Woody Woodpecker: Escape from Buzz Buzzard Park is an adventure game in the third person, in which the player controls his character in an environment modeled in computer graphics and real-time 3D, with the camera placed behind or around the figure. The game consists of twenty-one levels of type platform. The progress in the game is based primarily on the skill and dexterity needed to overcome obstacles that present themselves (to cross chasms, climb walls) or unblock access to the following level by manipulating objects (Woody sometimes needs use its beak to that effect). When Woody must skip a cross indicates in advance the precise location where it is about to fall, thus aiming at best. The game also includes a battle against the minions from Buzz Buzzard Woody can attack in different ways, using its beak or special attacks. Besides Woody Woodpecker himself, the player can also choose to play Knothead or Splinter once Woody found one of them.

Reception 

The game received a favorable critical reception at its release. The Windows version of the game gets an 81 out of 100 of the French magazine Joystick, which the judge "fairly good". The Critical Site jeuxvideo.com gives 16/20, highlighting its excellent maneuverability while its graphics and atmosphere cartoon successful; regrets however the life of the game a bit too short, the small number of different environments and sometimes repetitive music. The German critic Site Gamesmania gives the game 78%, while the PC Gameplay website gives it a 73 out of 100  The version for PlayStation 2 is also well received: Game Vortex site gives it 83%, PGNX Media gives 80%  and jeuxvideo.com 15/20; critic Game Zone, however, is less convinced and gives the game a score of 59 out of 100, reproaching the geometric graphics, repetitive music, sometimes annoying camera movements, and level paths being quite linear.

References

2001 video games
Cryo Interactive games
DreamCatcher Interactive games
Eko Software games
Game Boy Color games
Game Boy Color-only games
Platform games
PlayStation 2 games
Single-player video games
Video games based on Woody Woodpecker
Video games developed in Canada
Video games developed in France
Video games set in amusement parks
Windows games
Planet Interactive Development games